George Howell is an American journalist. He is the former anchor of CNN International's CNN Newsroom. He also reported for the network's weekday morning television show New Day.

Background 
Howell's family moved to Austin when he was a child. After finishing secondary education at Stephen F. Austin High School, he then attended the University of Texas at Austin where he completed a Bachelor of Journalism degree in 1999. During this period he was selected as a finalist in a national competition for excellence in journalism by the William Randolph Hearst Foundation.

Career 
In 1999, he started working as a news reporter for KREM-TV2, a CBS affiliate in Spokane, Washington. He later joined KXAN-TV 36, KCTS Television, and the Seattle-based KOMO-TV 4, KIRO-TV 7. He later joined the Atlanta-based WSB-TV 2, an ABC affiliate.

In 2013, Howell was hired by CNN as a news reporter along with Alina Machado, who also came from WSB, and Pamela Brown. He was first assigned as a national correspondent in CNN's Chicago bureau

The New York Association of Black Journalists and the Atlanta Association of Black Journalists have recognized Howell for his work as a journalist. In 2015, he was awarded the Native Star Award by the Greater Austin Black Chamber. Howell also earned several Emmy nominations.

On February 29, 2020, Howell announced he was leaving CNN.

References 

American male journalists
CNN people
Moody College of Communication alumni
Year of birth missing (living people)
Living people